Godfrey Patrick Ingram (born 26 October 1959) is an English retired professional footballer who played as a striker. Active in England, Wales and the United States, Ingram made over 440 career league appearances, and scored over 270 league goals.

Career
Born in Luton, Ingram began his career with the youth team of home town club Luton Town. He turned professional with Luton Town in 1977, and spent loan spells with the New York Cosmos and Northampton Town. After leaving Luton Town in 1982, Ingram returned to the North American Soccer League to play with the San Jose Earthquakes before returning to the UK to play with Welsh side Cardiff City. Ingram then returned to play for the rebranded Golden Bay Earthquakes during the 1982–1983 Major Indoor Soccer League season. He remained with the Earthquakes for the 1983 outdoor and 1983–1984 NASL indoor seasons. He then began the 1984 outdoor season with the 'Quakes before being traded to the Minnesota Strikers in May 1984. The NASL collapsed after the 1984 season, and Ingram signed with the Las Vegas Americans of the MISL. When the Americans folded at the end of the season, coach Don Popovic, along with several Las Vegas players including Ingram, moved to the Pittsburgh Spirit. The Spirit folded at the end of the season and the Tacoma Stars picked up his contract in July 1986. He began the 1987–1988 season with the Stars, but demanded to be traded after seeing a reduction in his playing time. On 4 December 1987, the Stars sent him to the St. Louis Steamers in exchange for Charlie Falzon and $20,000. He played eight games for the St. Louis Steamers before moving to the Dallas Sidekicks on 11 January 1988 for $75,000 and the Sidekicks second and third round draft picks. He finished the season in Dallas, began the 1988–1989 season and was released by the Sidekicks on 19 November 1988. Two days later, the Tacoma Stars picked him off waivers. The Stars released him on 5 July 1989 in a move to reduce the team salary. On 18 October 1989, he joined the St. Louis Storm and played three seasons with them. Ingram returned to England in 1992, playing league football with Peterborough United, and non-league football with St Albans City and Buckingham Town. He retired in 2001.

References

External links
Profile at Post War English & Scottish Football League A – Z Player's Database
Profile at Luton FC
Profile at Dallas Sidekicks
NASL statistics

1959 births
Living people
Cardiff City F.C. players
Dallas Sidekicks (original MISL) players
English footballers
English expatriate footballers
Golden Bay Earthquakes (MISL) players
Las Vegas Americans players
Luton Town F.C. players
Major Indoor Soccer League (1978–1992) players
Minnesota Strikers (NASL) players
North American Soccer League (1968–1984) indoor players
New York Cosmos players
North American Soccer League (1968–1984) players
Northampton Town F.C. players
Peterborough United F.C. players
Pittsburgh Spirit players
St Albans City F.C. players
St. Louis Steamers (original MISL) players
St. Louis Storm players
San Jose Earthquakes (1974–1988) players
Tacoma Stars players
Buckingham Town F.C. players
Association football forwards
English expatriate sportspeople in the United States
Expatriate soccer players in the United States